The Henry A. Kissinger Prize is awarded by the American Academy in Berlin for exceptional contributions to transatlantic relations. It was established in 2007 and named after U.S. politician Henry Kissinger, one of the American Academy's founding chairmen.

Recipients 
Source:

 2007  Helmut Schmidt
 2008  George H. W. Bush
 2009  Richard von Weizsäcker
 2010  Michael Bloomberg
 2011  Helmut Kohl
 2012  George P. Shultz
 2013 Ewald-Heinrich von Kleist
 2014 James A. Baker
 2015 Giorgio Napolitano and Hans-Dietrich Genscher
 2016 Samantha Power
 2017 Wolfgang Schäuble
 2018 John McCain
 2020 Angela Merkel
 2021 James Mattis
 2022 Frank-Walter Steinmeier

References

External links 
 

Awards established in 2007
German awards
Henry Kissinger